Alberto Libertazzi (born 1 January 1992) is an Italian professional footballer who plays as a forward for Serie D club Chieri.

Career

Juventus
Libertazzi made his professional debut for Juventus F.C. on December 1, 2010 in a 2010–11 UEFA Europa League game against Lech Poznań.

Novara
In 2012, he was included in the deal of Stefano Beltrame to Juventus from Novara. The 50% registration rights of Libertazzi was valued €450,000, while the 50% registration rights of Beltrame was valued for €750,000. Libertazzi signed a three-year contract. The co-ownership deal was renewed twice, in 2013, and 2014. Libertazzi also spent the whole 2013–14 season on loan, at first to fellow Piedmontese club Pro Vercelli. In January 2015 Libertazzi left Novara again for Pontedera.

In June 2015 Novara acquired Libertazzi outright from Juventus. On 14 July he was signed by Siena in a temporary deal. On 28 January 2016 the loan was terminated.

Libertazzi joined Swiss Challenge League side Servette.

On 29 September 2018, Gozzano signed him and Sampietro for free.

On 31 July 2019, he signed with Rende.

On 3 August 2021, he joined to RG Ticino in Serie D.

Honours
Juventus Primavera
 Viareggio Tournament (2): 2010, 2012

References

External links
 Profile by UEFA
  Profile on Italian FA website
 

1992 births
Living people
Footballers from Turin
Italian footballers
Association football forwards
Serie A players
Serie B players
Serie C players
Serie D players
Juventus F.C. players
Novara F.C. players
F.C. Pro Vercelli 1892 players
L'Aquila Calcio 1927 players
U.S. Città di Pontedera players
A.C.N. Siena 1904 players
A.C. Ancona players
A.S. Gubbio 1910 players
A.C. Gozzano players
A.S.D. Calcio Chieri 1955 players
Rende Calcio 1968 players
Swiss Challenge League players
Servette FC players
Italian expatriate footballers
Italian expatriate sportspeople in Switzerland
Expatriate footballers in Switzerland
Italy youth international footballers